Vinod Kumar Baranwal (born 9 July 1969) is a judge of Allahabad. Currently, he is posted in the Special MP/MLA court of Rai Bareli. His father's name was Ram Kailash Baranwal. He completed his B.A L.L.B from University of Allahabad. He has worked as the Chief Judicial Magistrate of Bareilly from 16 April 2012 to 15 April 2013.

References 

Living people
1969 births
21st-century Indian judges
University of Allahabad alumni
Indian judges
People from Azamgarh